The 2012 United States presidential election in Ohio took place on November 6, 2012, as part of the 2012 United States presidential election in which all 50 states plus the District of Columbia participated. Ohio voters chose 18 electors to represent them in the Electoral College via a popular vote pitting incumbent Democratic President Barack Obama and his running mate, Vice President Joe Biden, against Republican challenger and former Massachusetts Governor Mitt Romney and his running mate, Congressman Paul Ryan. This election continued Ohio's bellwether streak, as the state voted for the winner of the presidency in every election from 1964 to 2016.

President Obama won the popular vote in Ohio with 50.67% of the vote over Mitt Romney in second place at 47.69%, a Democratic victory margin of 2.98%. Obama's performance was a decline from 2008 when he won the state by a 4.57% margin over U.S. Senator John McCain, and he narrowly lost five counties that he won in 2008. However, he narrowly improved his margins in Cuyahoga County and Franklin County, home to the second largest city, Cleveland, and the state's capital and largest city, Columbus, respectively, allowing him to carry the state. Obama became the first Democrat to win the White House without Belmont County since 1892 and the first to win without neighboring Jefferson County since 1916.

As of the 2020 United States presidential election, this is the last time the Democratic presidential nominee won Ohio, as well as the last time Wood County, Ottawa County, Sandusky County, Erie County, Stark County, Portage County, Trumbull County, and Ashtabula County have voted Democratic.

Primaries

Democratic
The Democratic primary was held on March 6, 2012, the same day as the Republican primary. Incumbent President Barack Obama ran unopposed, and thus won all 151 of the state's delegates.

Republican

The 2012 Ohio Republican presidential primary took place on March 6, 2012.

Ohio has 66 delegates to the Republican National Convention. Three party officials (also known as "superdelegates") are not bound by the primary result. Forty-eight delegates are generally awarded winner-take-all by Congressional district. Another 15 delegates are awarded to the candidate who gets an outright majority statewide, or are allocated proportionately among candidates winning at least 20% of the vote if no candidate wins a majority.

Despite an early lead in the vote count and having won most counties, Santorum's lead was reduced and overcome by Romney as Hamilton and Cuyahoga County results came in. Romney also won areas such as Akron, Youngstown, Dayton and Columbus. These and other highly populated counties would eventually go to Obama in November.

Notes:

1. In the six congressional districts where Rick Santorum submitted only a partial slate of district delegates and district alternates by the late December 2011 deadline, he will be automatically awarded only the number of delegates he submitted, assuming he wins the particular district. The Ohio Republican Party said on March 2, 2012, that the remaining delegates in such districts will be "considered unbound" until a panel composed of three members of the Ohio GOP's central committee decides which campaign (if any) is permitted to appoint such delegates.

2. In three congressional districts (OH-6, OH-9 and OH-13), Rick Santorum did not make the district-specific portion of the ballot.

3. In every district, each of the 6 candidates listed above appears on the "at-large" portion of the ballot. The results of the at-large ballot will determine the allocation of fifteen national convention delegates.

General election

Campaign
Ohio was considered a key battleground state throughout the general election campaign, and both Barack Obama and Mitt Romney campaigned extensively in the state.

Results

Results by county

Counties that flipped from Democratic to Republican
 Belmont (largest city: Martins Ferry)
 Jefferson (largest city: Steubenville)
 Lake (largest city: Mentor)
 Monroe (largest city: Woodsfield)
 Tuscarawas (largest city: New Philadelphia)

By congressional district
Despite losing the state, Romney won 12 of 16 congressional districts.

Analysis 
Obama's victory in Ohio was enough to push him over the 270 electoral vote line allowing him to win the election. At first the Romney campaign contested the call, but conceded at about 1:00 A.M. Obama's victory in Ohio can be attributed to several factors. Obama only won 17 out of Ohio's 88 counties. However, those 17 counties combined account for 56.56% of the state's total population. Romney did do well in most rural areas of the state, particularly in western Ohio. Romney also won all but one county in the Appalachia region, becoming the first Republican since Richard Nixon’s 2,900-plus-county landslide in 1972 to carry Belmont, Jefferson and Monroe Counties, and losing only Athens County, home of Ohio University. He also managed to flip the swing counties of Lake and Tuscarawas. Romney also did well in the northern Columbus suburbs. For Romney, most of his wins came from smaller populated counties. Obama won by comfortable margins in Franklin, Hamilton, and Lucas counties, home to the cities of Columbus, Cincinnati, and Toledo, respectively. Obama's greatest support came from northeast Ohio, centered in Cuyahoga and Summit counties, home to the cities of Cleveland and Akron, respectively, the second and fourth largest cities in the state. The surrounding Cleveland–Akron–Canton metropolitan area and the Lake Erie shore went mostly to Obama, allowing him to carry the state as a whole by a fairly comfortable 2.98% margin.

In February 2013, nineteen cases of voter fraud were investigated in Hamilton County. Three individuals were charged with voter fraud the following month, with one individual alleged to have voted six times. These incidents would not have affected the outcome of the Ohio race as President Obama ultimately carried the state by 166,272 votes. Some experts believe that the popularity of the auto industry bailout put in place under President Obama helped him take the state.

See also
 United States presidential elections in Ohio
 2012 United States presidential debates
 2012 Republican Party presidential debates and forums
 2012 Republican Party presidential primaries
 Results of the 2012 Republican Party presidential primaries
 Ohio Republican Party

References

External links
The Green Papers: for Ohio
The Green Papers: Major state elections in chronological order

United States president
Ohio
2012